Albert Wilkins (16 February 1908 – 27 March 1970) was a South African cricketer. He played in twelve first-class matches for Border from 1931/32 to 1934/35.

See also
 List of Border representative cricketers

References

External links
 

1908 births
1970 deaths
South African cricketers
Border cricketers
Sportspeople from Qonce